Shaun Proulx (born August 1, 1968) is a Canadian media entrepreneur, speaker, author, publisher, interviewer and radio personality, who currently hosts the weekly The Shaun Proulx Show on SiriusXM's Canada Talks. In late September 2013, during a live interview with the CBC Radio's Matt Galloway, Proulx publicly disclosed that he was diagnosed HIV+ in 2005. He has contributed to The Globe and Mail and to Toronto's LGBT newspaper Xtra!, and was the afternoon radio host on 103.9 PROUD FM (CIRR-FM).

DecAIDS – Anything Is Possible, a documentary produced by Proulx, won "Best Social Documentary" at WorldFest in 2007, won "Best Full Length Feature" at the New York AIDS Film Festival in 2007, and was an official selection of the Hollywood Festival the same year.

Proulx also works as a keynote speaker and coach.

Career
Shaun Proulx Media produces the TheGayGuideNetwork.com, Canada's first gay web portal, established in 2002. It also produces The Shaun Proulx Show and Gold Access App, focusing on gay men and the women in their lives.

Proulx formerly had his own one-hour television talk show, The Shaun Proulx Show on OUTtv, a Canadian gay television station.

Personal life
Proulx is openly gay, and recently divorced from former porn actor Eddie Stone.

Filmography
2001: Die Mutter - actor
2001: Three Shades of Black - actor
2007: DecAIDS – Anything Is Possible - creative producer and story editor

Theater
2000: The Most Fabulous Story Ever Told - lead actor - Buddies in Bad Times
2001: Unidentified Human Remains and the True Nature of Love - actor - Workman Theatre

Bibliography
2003: Quickies 3 – Short Stories on Gay Male Desire.  Vancouver, Arsenal Pulp Press

References

External links
 Shaun Proulx's official website
 The Shaun Proulx Show page on OUTtv website
 Gay Guide Toronto - gay web portal published by Shaun Proulx

1968 births
Canadian newspaper journalists
Canadian male journalists
Canadian radio personalities
Canadian gay writers
Living people
Canadian LGBT broadcasters
Canadian LGBT journalists
Writers from Toronto